Admiral John Rogers Anderson,  (born 9 September 1941) is a retired Canadian Forces officer, former Canadian diplomat and civil servant.

Early life and career
Anderson was born in British Columbia and attended University of British Columbia; he graduated with a BSc. He joined the Royal Canadian Navy in 1959 and worked his way up the ranks. From 1963 to 1966 he served at HMCS Stadacona taking the Long Operations Course, the destroyers ,  and at Royal Roads Military College. He was appointed to the aircraft carrier  in 1968. In 1970, he joined the CCS 280 Programming Team as a Programmer at Canadian Forces Headquarters (CFHQ) in Ottawa.

Military career
In 1974, Anderson became executive officer in the destroyer . In 1975, he studied at the Canadian Forces Command and Staff College in Toronto. He became commanding officer of the destroyer  in 1978, commanding officer of the Naval Officers' Training Centre at CFB Esquimalt in 1980 and commander of the First Canadian Destroyer Squadron in 1982. He went on to become Director Maritime Requirements (Sea) at the National Defence Headquarters in 1983, Director General of Maritime Doctrine and Operations in 1986 and Chief of the Canadian Nuclear Submarine Acquisition Project in 1987. After that he became Chief of Maritime Doctrine and Operations in 1989, Commander Maritime Command in 1991, in which role he was appointed to take possession of  - the first of a completely new class of frigates, and Vice Chief of the Defence Staff in 1992. His was made Chief of Defence Staff of the Canadian Forces in 1993 before retiring at the end of the year. He last appointment was as Canada's Ambassador and Permanent Representative to the North Atlantic Treaty Organization in Brussels, Belgium in 1994.

He was made a Commander of the Order of Military Merit in 1989.

Awards and decorations
Anderson's personal awards and decorations include the following:

|105px

References

 

|-

|-

1941 births
Living people
Vice Chiefs of the Defence Staff (Canada)
Chiefs of the Defence Staff (Canada)
Canadian admirals
Canadian civil servants
People from Trail, British Columbia
University of British Columbia alumni
Permanent Representatives of Canada to NATO
Royal Canadian Navy officers
Commanders of the Order of Military Merit (Canada)
Commanders of the Royal Canadian Navy
Canadian military personnel from British Columbia